Carmine Gentile (16 July 1678 - 11 July 1763) was an Italian painter and potter of maiolica in Castelli, Abruzzo.  He trained with Carlo Antonio Grue, the son of Francesco Grue. His sons Giacomo il Giovane (born 1717) and Berardino (1727-1813) were also maiolica painters. Giacomo il Vecchio lived 1768-1813.

References

External links 

 Gentili - Barnabei archive, Getty Research Institute, Los Angeles. Accession No. 880209. Records related to the production and decoration of ceramics, especially majolica, by three generations of the Gentili family, ca. 1650-ca. 1813. Included are some 19th and 20th century papers of Barnabei and his family relating to the history of potters in Castelli. The archive was formerly owned by historian Felice Barnabei.

1678 births
1763 deaths
Italian potters
18th-century Italian painters
Italian male painters
18th-century Italian male artists